Lara Cody is an American voice actress. She also goes under the name Deanna Morris  and is best known for voicing Rosemary in Metal Gear Solid 2: Sons of Liberty and Metal Gear Solid 4: Guns of The Patriots.

Roles

Anime
A Little Snow Fairy Sugar – Pepper
Akira – Kei (Streamline dub)
Bleach – Hiyori Sarugaki (1st Voice, Eps. 112–138)
Castle in the Sky – Sheeta, Okami (as Louise Chambell) (Streamline dub)
Dirty Pair – Kei (Streamline dub)
Eagle Riders – Dr. Aikens
Fight! Iczer One - Nagisa Kano
Gatchaman (OVA) – June
Honey & Clover – Rika Harada
IGPX – Jane Rublev
Kanokon – Yuki Sasamori
Kiki's Delivery Service – Ket, Ket's Aunt, Hometown Friend 1, Tombo's Friend 3 (Streamline dub)
Kyou Kara Maou! – Raven (Young), Ulrike
Magical Girl Pretty Sammy – Tsunami (Eps. 2–3)
Mobile Suit Gundam (The Movie Trilogy – Icelina Echonbach
My Neighbor Totoro – Female Motorist, Bus Attendant (Streamline dub)
Noein – Lily, Miho Mukai, Tobi, Yoshi's Mother
Noozles – Pinky, Emily
Robotech – Kim Young, Jason
Swan Lake - Margarita
Tenchi in Tokyo – Masayo Manuketa
Tenchi Muyo! GXP – Fuku, Gyokuren (Ep. 20-24)
Tenchi Muyo! Ryo-Ohki OVA 3 – Mashisu Makibi, Fuku
Unico in the Island of Magic - Spinx's Daughter
Vampire Hunter D – Dan Lang

Video games
Age of Empires III – Microsoft
Bleach: The 3rd Phantom – Hiyori Sarugaki
Guild Wars 2 – Luta, Riel Darkwater 
Metal Gear Solid 2: Sons of Liberty/ Metal Gear Solid 4: Guns of the Patriots – Rosemary
Orphen: Scion of Sorcery – Rani
The World Ends with You – Mitsuki Konishi

References

External links
 

American voice actresses
American video game actresses
Living people
21st-century American women
Year of birth missing (living people)